Protanancus is an extinct genus of amebelodontid proboscidean from Kenya, Pakistan and Thailand. The genus consists solely of type species P. macinnesi.<ref name="fossilworks" /
The generic name is derived from the unrelated Anancus, and the Greek prōtos "first".

Description
Protanancus, about the size of a present-day Asian elephant, was presumably quite similar to the related proboscidean Platybelodon. Like Platybelodon, the mandibular symphysis of this species was narrow and elongated, and possessed two flattened tusks. Investigation of the structure of the lower tusks revealed that those of Protanancus were concentric, like those of most proboscideans (including present-day proboscideans), while those of Platybelodon possessed dentinal tubules.

Classification
Protanancus was described by Arambourg in 1945.<ref name="arambourg1945"/ Several species are known of this animal: the Asian P. chinjiensis, P. brevirostris and P. tobieni, and the African P. macinnesi. The most recent remains are African and those from the Siwaliks area. This animal is thought to have evolved from Gomphotherium, and developed over millions of years to give rise to other similar animals such as Platybelodon or Amebelodon. Protanancus is also related to Archaeobelodon. Other fossils have been found in Bulgaria.

Paleobiology
Fossils of Protanancus in China have been found in the same locations as those of Platybelodon. However, it appears that after living together for at least two million years, Platybelodon survived and Protanancus became extinct. Only in the area where Platybelodon was not present (the Siwalik) did Protanancus still thrive. The shape of the jaws of the two animals indicates that they had the same lifestyle, with shovel-like tusks that could pick up plant material. However, the tubular structure of Platybelodon's tusks indicates that this animal bore greater loads and more abrasion than Protanancus.<ref name="wangetal2015"/

References 

Prehistoric placental genera
Amebelodontidae
Miocene proboscideans
Miocene first appearances
Miocene extinctions